River House may refer to:
 Bronx River Houses, a public housing complex in New York
 Fox River House, a hotel in Aurora, Illinois
 Harlem River Houses, a public housing complex in New York
 Las Olas River House, an apartment building in Fort Lauderdale, Florida
 River House Condominiums, an apartment building in Grand Rapids, Michigan
 River House (London), an apartment building in Chelsea, London
 River House (New York City), an apartment building in Manhattan, New York
 River House, York, a former club in York, in England
 River House Restaurant, site of the 1989 Loveland River House Incident
 River House School, a school in Warwickshire
 River House (Virginia), a plantation in Virginia
 The River House, a former restaurant in Lancashire, England